Trinity Episcopal Church is a historic Episcopal church at 316 Adams Street in Toledo, Ohio. It was built in 1863 in a Gothic Revival style. The building was added to the National Register in 1983.

In 1910 the Skinner Organ Company installed a new pipe organ in the church. At a cost of $17,000, it was the largest organ in Toledo.

References

Episcopal churches in Ohio
Churches on the National Register of Historic Places in Ohio
Gothic Revival church buildings in Ohio
Churches completed in 1863
Churches in Toledo, Ohio
National Register of Historic Places in Lucas County, Ohio
19th-century Episcopal church buildings